Brooke Boquist (born July 27, 1996) is a Canadian ice hockey forward, currently playing with the Toronto Six of the Premier Hockey Federation (PHF).

Playing career 
Across 139 NCAA Division I games with the Providence Friars of Hockey East, Boquist scored 91 points. She led the team in goals during the 2015–16 and 2016–17 seasons, and served as an assistant captain for the team during the latter. She studied management while attending Providence College.

Professional
After graduating, she signed her first professional contract with Modo Hockey Dam of the Swedish Women's Hockey League (SDHL), having been recruited as a potential top-line centre after several star players left the club. She would score 20 points in 17 games in her rookie SDHL season before being sidelined with a concussion. She joined Leksands IF Dam the next season, her signing being announced in mid-October after the club picked up only two points in their first nine games. She posted 29 points in 24 games with Leksands, finishing first on the team for goals and second in points. She earned the SDHL Goal of the Week Award in the third week of 2020.

In May 2020, she announced she was returning to North America alongside Leksands teammate Emma Woods to sign with the NWHL expansion team the Toronto Six. Boquist logged her first-ever goal in NWHL play in a 2–1 triumph against the eventual Isobel Cup champion Boston Pride. Opposing the Pride on January 26, 2021, the Six fought back from a 1–0 deficit with a pair of third period goals by Boquist and Mikyla Grant-Mentis. Boquist was named the First Star of the Game, while Elaine Chuli recorded 24 svaes in the win.

Career statistics

References

External links
 

1996 births
Canadian expatriate ice hockey players in Sweden
Canadian women's ice hockey centres
Leksands IF players
Living people
Modo Hockey players
Providence Friars women's ice hockey players
Sportspeople from Thunder Bay
Toronto Six players